The National Medals of Appreciation and Memorial is an honor bestowed by the President of Iran to individuals  who have made important contributions to the advancement of knowledge in various fields of science or have lost their lives defending the country. The presidential Committee on the National Medals is responsible for selecting award recipients and is administered by the Presidential Office.

History 
The National Medals of Appreciation and Memorial were established on November 21, 2010, by an act of the Cabinet of Iran. The National Medal of Appreciation is to honor scientists who have shown significant contributions to the development of the country. The National Medal of Memorial is to honor those who lost their lives defending the country. The National Medals of Appreciation and Memorial are classified as Golden and Silver Medals.

National Medal of Appreciation 
2010 Meisam Tabatabaei
2010 Hamed Sani Khanin
2010 Mohammad Rashidian
2015 Esmail Baghaei
2015 Behzad Saberi
2015 Mohammad Amiri
2015 Mohammad Hassan Daryayi

The awards ceremony is organized by the Office of President of Iran. It is presided by the sitting President of Iran.

References

External links 
 پایگاه اطلاع‌رسانی اعطای نشانهای دولتی

Science and technology awards
Awards established in 2010
Civil awards and decorations of Iran